Policy and Charging Rules Function (PCRF) is the software node designated in real-time to determine policy rules in a multimedia network.

PCRF may also refer to:
 Palestine Children's Relief Fund
 Public Cause Research Foundation
 Parti Communiste Révolutionnaire de France